Mango Crazy is the fourth studio album by singer Roger Chapman and his band The Shortlist. The album was released 1983.

Track listing 
All songs have been composed by Roger Chapman.

Side one
 "Mango Crazy" – 4:19  	
 "Toys: Do You?" – 4:06 	
 "I Read Your File" – 4:00 	
 "Los Dos Bailadores" – 3:44 	
 "Blues Breaker" – 4:14 	
 "Turn It Up" – 4:05

Side two
 " Let Me Down" – 3:21  	
 "Hunt The Man" – 6:03 	
 "Rivers Run Dry" – 4:07 	
 "I Really Can't Go Straight" – 4:14 	
 "Room Service" – 2:56 	
 "Hegoshegowegoamigo" – 0:56

Personnel 
Roger Chapman – vocals
J. Lawrence Cook – keyboards
Duncan Mackay – keyboards
Ronnie Leahy – keyboards
Geoff Whitehorn – guitars
Steve Simpson – violin, mandolin, guitar, vocals
Boz Burrell – bass guitar
Alan Coulter – drums
Nick Pentelow – saxophone

References

External links

 
 
 

Roger Chapman albums
1983 albums
RCA Records albums